Melissa Brown may refer to:

 Melissa Brown (politician), American politician
 Melissa Brown (tennis) (born 1968), American tennis player
 Melissa Brown (artist) (born 1974), American artist
 Melissa A. Brown, American diplomat
Melissa J. Brown (born 1963), American anthropologist and historian

See also
Mel Brown (disambiguation)